The bowling at the 1985 Southeast Asian Games was held at the Star Bowl in Bangkok, Thailand between December 10 to December 15.

Medals by event

References
BASOC (1985) 13th SEA Games Official Report, Thailand

1985 Southeast Asian Games
1985 Southeast Asian Games
1985 in bowling